Anthony Wilson is an album by jazz guitarist Anthony Wilson.

Background
This was Wilson's debut album. He commented that using a nonet meant that the album "is a record of experimentation, of me finding a sound. I love this instrumentation. It preserves the sound of a small band, but it can sound big when I want it to".

Music and recording
Seven of the 10 tracks are Wilson originals. He also wrote all of the arrangements, except for "The Parisian Knights", which he transcribed from the original Lucky Thompson recording. The album was released on July 1, 1997, by MAMA Records.

Reception

The AllMusic reviewer concluded that, "overall, this is a highly enjoyable effort, a strong start to Anthony Wilson's career." It was nominated for a Grammy Award in the Best Large Jazz Ensemble category.

Track listing
"Fargas Shuffle" – 6:51
"The Parisian Knights" – 5:59
"Karaoke" – 10:09
"Leila" – 7:02
"The New Fawn-Do!" – 8:29 	
"Southern Gentleman" – 9:20
"Pachinko" – 4:47
"Do Nothin' Till You Hear from Me" – 7:15
"Monsignor" – 7:11 	
"Remington Ride" – 6:59

Personnel
 Anthony Wilson – guitar
 Carl Saunders – trumpet
 Ira Nepus – trombone
 Louis Taylor – reeds
 Pete Christlieb – tenor sax
 Jack Nimitz – baritone sax
 Brad Mehldau – piano
 Danton Boller – bass
 Willie Jones, III – drums
 Bennie Wallace – tenor sax (track 6)

References

1997 albums